A Bullet for Pretty Boy was an American metalcore band from Longview, Texas. The band started making music in 2006. The band released an independently made album, Beauty in the Eyes of the Beholder, in 2008. They signed to Razor & Tie and Artery Recordings, where they released, Revision:Revise, a studio album, in 2010. Their subsequent studio album, Symbiosis, was released by Razor & Tie alongside Artery Recordings, in 2012. The band is on hiatus as of 2015, with vocalist Danon Saylor forming a new band with For Today and Silent Planet members called Nothing Left.

Background 
A Bullet for Pretty Boy formed in Longview, Texas. The band's current members are vocalist Danon Saylor, guitarist Chris Johnston, vocalist/ keyboardist Josh Modisette, with their past members being vocalist and guitarist, Derrick Sechrist, bass guitarists Brian Bingham and Taylor Kimball, and drummer Josh Trammel.

History 
The band commenced as a musical entity in 2006, with their first release, Beauty in the Eyes of the Beholder, an album that was released independently on March 8, 2008, They signed to Razor & Tie alongside Artery Recordings, where they released a studio album, Revision:Revise, on November 9, 2010. Their subsequent studio album released by the aforementioned labels, Symbiosis, on July 31, 2012.

Members 
Former Members
Danon Saylor – Unclean Vocals (2006–2015)
Chris Johnston – Lead Guitar/ Backing Vocals (2006–2015)
Derrick Sechrist – Rhythm Guitar, Clean Vocals (2006–2012)
Zane Callister – Rhythm Guitar (Touring) (2012–2015)
Josh Modisette – Keyboards, Backing and later Clean Vocals (2006–2015)
Brian Bingham – Bass (2006–2010)
Taylor Kimball – Bass (2010–2011)
Patrick Little – Bass (Touring) (2012–2015)
Josh Trammel – Drums, Clean Vocals (2006–2010)
Jared Easterling – Drums (Touring and Studio on Revision:Revise) (2010–2011)
Garrett Jensen – Drums (Touring) – (2011)
Matt Weir – Drums (Studio on Symbiosis) (2012)
William Steffen – Drums (Touring) (2012–2015)
Scott Carter – Unclean Vocals (2006–2008)

Discography 
Studio albums
 Revision:Revise (November 9, 2010, Razor & Tie/Artery)
 Symbiosis (July 31, 2012, Razor & Tie/Artery)

Independent albums
 Beauty in the Eyes of the Beholder (March 8, 2008, Independent)

References

External links 
 Facebook page

Musical groups from Texas
2006 establishments in Texas
Musical groups established in 2006
Razor & Tie artists
Metalcore musical groups from Texas